MV Acavus was one of nine Anglo Saxon Royal Dutch/Shell tankers converted to become a Merchant Aircraft Carrier (MAC ship). The group is collectively called the Rapana Class.

Acavus was built by Workman, Clark and Company of Belfast for the Anglo-Saxon Petroleum Company, launching on 24 November 1934, and completing in 1935. She measured 8010 gross register tons and 4752 net register tons. A single  Sulzer diesel engine was fitted.

In 1942–1943, Acavus was converted by Silley Cox & Co. at Falmouth to a MAC ship, entering service in October 1943. Displacement was  full load and  standard. The ship had an armament of a single 4 inch (102 mm) QF Mk. IV gun, with an anti-aircraft armament of two 40 mm Bofors guns and six Oerlikon 20 mm cannon.

She continued to carry normal cargoes, with capacity about 90% of that pre-conversion, although this was restricted to crude oil to minimise the potential fire hazard. Only her aircrew and the necessary maintenance staff were naval personnel.

At the end of the war Acavus was reconverted to an oil tanker, and renamed Iacra in 1963. She was in service until 1963 when she was scrapped in Italy.

References

Oil tankers
Acavus
1934 ships